Kaiit, born Kaiit Bellamia Waup on 29 October 1997 in Papua New Guinea),  is a neo soul singer from Melbourne, Victoria.

At the ARIA Music Awards of 2019 she won an ARIA Music Award in the category of Best Soul/R&B Release for "Miss Shiney".

Personal life
Her partner in life is singer Adrian Eagle. Kaiit is non-binary, and uses she/her, he/him, and they/them pronouns.

In August 2021, Kaiit launched a GoFundMe page in order to "recover [her] independence as an artist" and continue releasing new music.

Discography

Extended plays

Singles

Awards and nominations

APRA Awards
The APRA Awards are presented annually from 1982 by the Australasian Performing Right Association (APRA), "honouring composers and songwriters".

! 
|-
| 2019
| "OG Luv Kush Pt 2" by Kaiit (Kaiit Waup / Michael Chan / Anthony Douglas / Mohamed Komba / Jaydean Miranda / Damian Smith)
| Song of the Year
| 
| 
|-
| 2020 
| "Miss Shiney" by Kaiit (Kaiit Waup / Vincent Goodyer / Nicholas Martin)
| Song of the Year
| 
| 
|-
|}

ARIA Music Awards
The ARIA Music Awards is an annual awards ceremony that recognises excellence, innovation, and achievement across all genres of Australian music.

|-
| 2019
| "Miss Shiney"
| Best Soul/R&B Release
| 
|-

Music Victoria Awards
The Music Victoria Awards, are an annual awards night celebrating Victorian music. They commenced in 2005.

|-
| rowspan="3"| 2018
| herself
| Best Hip Hop Act
| 
|-
| herself
| Breakthrough Act
| 
|-
| herself
| Archie Roach Award for Emerging Talent
| 
|-
| 2019
| herself
| Best Hip Hop Act
| 
|-

Vanda & Young Global Songwriting Competition
The Vanda & Young Global Songwriting Competition is an annual competition that "acknowledges great songwriting whilst supporting and raising money for Nordoff-Robbins" and is coordinated by Albert Music and APRA AMCOS. It commenced in 2009.

|-
| 2019
| "Miss Shiney"
| Unpublished prize
| 
|-

References

1997 births
Papua New Guinean singers
Living people
21st-century Australian women singers
ARIA Award winners
Musicians from Melbourne
Non-binary singers
Australian LGBT singers